Alain Marion (25 December 1938 – 16 August 1998) was a French flutist, and considered one of the world's best flute players of the late twentieth century.

Biography
Marion was born in Marseille on Christmas Day 1938. He studied at the Marseille Conservatoire under renowned flutist Joseph Rampal, and gained the award premier prix de flûte when he was only 14. He later studied with Rampal at the Conservatoire de Paris (where he eventually became a professor), and gained fame after winning a prize at the Geneva International Music Competition.

In 1964, the French national broadcaster Radiodiffusion-Télévision Française
appointed Marion as first flutist, and later to the Orchestre de Paris. In 1972 he became a soloist for the Orchestre National de France. He joined the chamber orchestra Ensemble InterContemporain in 1977, working with Pierre Boulez.

He taught every summer at the Académie internationale d'été in Nice, becoming director in 1986. His stature was able to attract some of the world's best musicians to the organisation as teachers, including Jean-Pierre Rampal, Jessye Norman and Henryk Szeryng.

Marion played a gold flute, made by the Sankyo Flute Company of Japan, and encompassed a wide variety of different musical styles. However he expressed a special admiration for the great baroque flutist-composers, as well as for the Czech composer Bohuslav Martinů.

Marion died of a heart attack while on tour in Seoul, South Korea, aged 59.

References

External links
Photographs of Alain Marion at the Académie Internationale d'Eté in Nice, 1968, 1970 & 1974

Musicians from Marseille
1938 births
1998 deaths
French classical flautists
20th-century classical musicians
20th-century French musicians
20th-century flautists